Kimon Evan Marengo (February 4, 1904 – November 4, 1988), better known for his pen name Kem, was a British cartoonist who was born in Zifta, Egypt. He was the son of Evangelos Marangos, a Greek cotton merchant.

Marengo grew up in the Greek community in Alexandria, Egypt. In his childhood he produced his own satirical hobby magazine. In 1929 he went to study at the Ecole des Sciences Politiques in Paris, graduating in 1931. He began to draw cartoons for newspapers, including Le Canard enchaîné, Le Petit Parisien, the Daily Herald and The Daily Telegraph.

Marengo attended the University of Oxford in 1939, but when World War II erupted, he joined the Ministry of Information and drew 3.000 propaganda posters, leaflets, and political cartoons in various languages, including three dialects of Arabic and Persian. This included British propaganda effort to get the support of the Persians. He wrote eight books. He was also involved with the Political Warfare Executive in the French and North African and later Middle East matters.

After the war Marengo went back to his studies in Oxford and graduated at the end of 1946 due to accelerated BA programme. His eventual thesis was The Cartoon as a Political Weapon in England: 1783-1832.

From 1939 he designed and printed his own Christmas cards for his friends and business connections. They invariably consisted of a cartoon depicting a major political development of the outgoing year. He also imprinted on them his cartoonist coat of arms: a shield with a drawing of his face and the word 'Kem' on a green field, supported on either side by an African man in white, wearing a red fez and bandana and cocking a snook. It was topped by a coronet with the motto at the bottom, 'Après moi le deluge'.

He had two sons with his wife Una, Richard and Alexander.

Publications
Oua Riglak. Gare les Pattes, 1928
Alexandrie, Reine de la Méditerranée, 1928
Toy Titans, 1937
Adolf and his donkey Benito, 1942
Lines of attack, 1944

References

1904 births
1988 deaths
Sciences Po alumni
British cartoonists
Egyptian people of Greek descent
People from Lemnos
People from Gharbia Governorate
Egyptian emigrants to the United Kingdom